Todd Robert Monken (born February 5, 1966) is an American football coach who is the offensive coordinator for the Baltimore Ravens of the National Football League (NFL). He was also the former offensive coordinator for the University of Georgia, Cleveland Browns, Tampa Bay Buccaneers, Oklahoma State University and Eastern Michigan University, as well as the former head coach at the University of Southern Mississippi.

College years
Monken attended Knox College in Galesburg, Illinois, where he was a three-year letter-winner at quarterback for Knox and earned first-team small college All-America as a senior. While attending Knox, he was a member of the Xi Chapter of Beta Theta Pi. He  earned a bachelor's degree in economics from Knox and a master's degree in education leadership from Grand Valley State University.

Coaching career

Early years

Monken got his start in coaching at Grand Valley State under Tom Beck.  When Beck moved to Notre Dame as offensive coordinator in 1991, Monken also joined the staff as a graduate assistant.  During his time at Grand Valley, he coached with defensive assistant Brian Kelly, the current coach of Louisiana State University. As the offensive coordinator Monken led Eastern Michigan to some of the best offenses in the history of the program.

In his second stint at Oklahoma State he tutored Justin Blackmon into one of the best receivers in college football. Mike Gundy introduced him as the next offensive coordinator tasked with keeping one of the nation's best offenses as potent as it has been in recent years. Gundy stated, “Todd is a really good fit for what we need. He’s been in the Big 12 and SEC and he’s coached at places that have won at a high level. He’s an experienced, intelligent coach who will be able to come in and help us pick up where we left off. We’re excited to have him join our staff.”

Jacksonville Jaguars 
In 2007, Monken was hired by the Jacksonville Jaguars to be their wide receivers coach.

Southern Miss 
On December 10, 2012, it was reported that Monken accepted the position as head coach of the Southern Miss football team. He was hired to replace Ellis Johnson after an 0–12 season.

Tampa Bay Buccaneers 
On January 24, 2016, Monken was hired by the Tampa Bay Buccaneers to be their offensive coordinator. After Buccaneers head coach Dirk Koetter was fired after the 2018 season, Monken was not retained on new head coach Bruce Arians' staff.

Cleveland Browns 
On January 14, 2019, Monken was hired by the Cleveland Browns to be their offensive coordinator under new head coach Freddie Kitchens.

Georgia 
On January 17, 2020, Monken was hired by the Georgia Bulldogs to be their offensive coordinator and quarterbacks coach under head coach, Kirby Smart.  He was part of the Bulldogs' coaching staff that won the National Championship over Alabama in the 2021 season. He won his second championship as part of the Georgia coaching staff when they defeated TCU in the National Championship.

Baltimore Ravens 
On February 14, 2023, the Baltimore Ravens announced Monken as their offensive coordinator after the departure of Greg Roman.

Personal life
Monken is a native of Wheaton, Illinois. Monken and his wife, Terri, have one son, Travis. He is a cousin of Army head coach Jeff Monken. His younger brother Ted Monken is the former head football coach for St. Charles East and West Chicago.

Head coaching record

References

External links
 Baltimore Ravens bio
 Georgia Bulldogs bio

1966 births
Living people
American football quarterbacks
Baltimore Ravens coaches
Cleveland Browns coaches
Eastern Michigan Eagles football coaches
Grand Valley State Lakers football coaches
Jacksonville Jaguars coaches
Knox Prairie Fire football players
LSU Tigers football coaches
Louisiana Tech Bulldogs football coaches
National Football League offensive coordinators
Notre Dame Fighting Irish football coaches
Oklahoma State Cowboys football coaches
Southern Miss Golden Eagles football coaches
Sportspeople from Wheaton, Illinois
Coaches of American football from Illinois
Players of American football from Illinois